Gülsüm Güleçyüz (born November 16, 1993 ) is a Turkish women's handballer, who plays in the Turkish Women's Handball Super League for Muratpaşa Bld. SK, and the Turkey national team. She plays in the right back position.

Playing career

Club
Gülsüm Güleçyüz plays right back for Muratpaşa Bld. SK, which competes in the Turkish Women's Handball Super League.

Her team became league champion two consecutive seasons in 2012–13, 2013–14. In the 2014–15 season, her team lost the champion title in the play-offs.

Güleçyüz played in the Women's EHF Cup Winners' Cup matches of 2013–14, at the Women's EHF Champions League of 2013–14 as well as at the Women's EHF Cup games (2014–15 and 2015–16).

In June 2015, she renewed her contract with Muratpaşa Bld. Sk for one year.

International
Gülsüm Güleçyüz is part of the Turkey women's national handball team. She played at the 2015 World Women's Handball Championship – European qualification, and 2016 European Women's Handball Championship qualification matches.

Honours
 Turkish Women's Handball Super League
 Winners (2): 2012–13, 2013–14.
 Runner-up (1): 2014–15.

References 

1993 births
People from Çorum
Turkish female handball players
Muratpaşa Bld. SK (women's handball) players
Turkey women's national handball players
Living people
Competitors at the 2018 Mediterranean Games
Mediterranean Games competitors for Turkey
21st-century Turkish sportswomen